Presidential elections were held in Mexico in 1872 following the death of president Benito Juárez. The result was a victory for Sebastián Lerdo de Tejada, who received 92% of the vote.

Results

References

Mexico
President
Presidential elections in Mexico
Election and referendum articles with incomplete results